The Crazy Castle series is a platform game series created by Kemco and released on the Famicom Disk System, Nintendo Entertainment System, Game Boy, Game Boy Color, and Game Boy Advance. It stars different popular cartoon characters, most notably the Warner Bros. cartoon character Bugs Bunny, the Walt Disney cartoon character Mickey Mouse and the Universal cartoon character Woody Woodpecker.

History
Kemco started the franchise after they licensed the rights to produce a Famicom Disk System game based on the film Who Framed Roger Rabbit. When Kemco was planning to release it outside Japan, there was already an NES game based on the same film developed by Rare and published by LJN. In order to release it outside Japan, Kemco bought the rights to Warner Bros.' Looney Tunes franchise to produce Looney Tunes-based video games.

When the promotion of the film Who Framed Roger Rabbit in Japan ended, Kemco lost the rights to produce video games based on the film there, but gained the rights to produce Disney-based ones, due to the Who Framed Roger Rabbit film being produced by Touchstone Pictures, a studio owned by The Walt Disney Company. Kemco later produced their Mickey Mouse versions in the Crazy Castle series and released most of these versions exclusively in Japan, while continuing their Looney Tunes versions outside Japan; however, some were based on other licenses such as Jim Davis's Garfield comic strip and The Real Ghostbusters animated television series.

Prior to the release of Bugs Bunny: Crazy Castle 3 worldwide, Kemco released the compilation Bugs Bunny Collection exclusively in Japan, which was a re-release of Mickey Mouse I and II, but with the Bugs Bunny sprite set and other minor updates (such as the Super Game Boy support). The rest of the games in the Crazy Castle series were released as original titles throughout all territories from this point forward.

The fifth entry of the Crazy Castle series starred Walter Lantz's Woody Woodpecker in the role, rather than Bugs Bunny, due to Kemco losing their license to release Warner Bros. properties, while switching to the exclusive rights for releasing Universal Studios properties, because of their release of the Nintendo GameCube title, Universal Studios Theme Parks Adventure, in which Woody was also one of the main characters.

Gameplay
While presented in a side-scrolling platform game format, The Crazy Castle games do not have a jump function. Only by taking different routes (for example by stairs, ladders and teleporters) can the character avoid enemies and collect certain items. Some of the levels have weapons or invincibility items that can be used against the enemies in the game. There are also objects that the player must collect in order to complete a level, like keys. Passwords can be used to start at a certain level.

Games in the series

Reception
GamePro gave Bugs Bunny Crazy Castle 2 a fairly positive review, opining that "with smooth animation, good fun, and lively action, Bugs Bunny on the Game Boy is actually better than the NES version."

References

Kemco games
Activision games
Famicom Disk System games
Nintendo Entertainment System games
Game Boy games
Game Boy Color games
Game Boy Advance games
Video games featuring Bugs Bunny
Video games based on Woody Woodpecker
Video games based on Garfield
Video games based on animated television series
Video games about witchcraft
Ghostbusters video games
Side-scrolling platform games
Mickey Mouse video games
Video game franchises
Video game franchises introduced in 1989
Video games set in castles
Who Framed Roger Rabbit video games